Thomas Paul Salmon (born August 19, 1932) is an American Democratic Party politician who served as the 75th governor of Vermont from 1973 to 1977.

Biography
Salmon was born in Cleveland, Ohio, raised in Stow, Massachusetts, and attended Hudson High School in Hudson, Massachusetts. He earned his undergraduate degree from Boston College in 1954, and earned a J.D. from Boston College Law School in 1957. He earned an LL.M. degree in taxation from New York University Law School in 1958. He married Madeleine G. Savaria and they had four children. His son, Thomas M. Salmon served as State Auditor of Vermont from 2007 to 2013, and switched his political affiliation to Republican in 2009.

Career
In 1959 Salmon was elected as Town Councilor for Rockingham, Vermont, serving until 1972. From 1963 to 1965, he served as a municipal court judge in Bellows Falls, Vermont, a village within the town of Rockingham. He was a member of the Vermont House of Representatives from Rockingham in 1965, and from District 13-1 for 1966, from 1967 to 1968 and from 1969 to 1970. He served one year as House Minority Leader.

In 1972, Salmon won a surprise election for governor, only entering the race 3 months before the general election. As Governor of Vermont from 1973 to 1977, Salmon chaired the New England Governors' Conference for two years and was a member of the National Governors Association's Executive Committee. He was an unsuccessful candidate for U.S. Senator from Vermont in the 1976 election, losing to the incumbent Robert Stafford.

In 1991, Salmon was appointed interim president of the University of Vermont and served as the university's permanent president from 1993 to 1998. Since retiring from UVM, he has practiced law in Bellows Falls, Vermont. He also served as chairman of the board for Green Mountain Power from 1983 to 2002.

Salmon is a Catholic; and a member of several organization including the Elks, Moose, Knights of Columbus, Jaycees, Rotary, and the American Bar Association.

References

External links
 Bio, vermontfolklifecenter.org.
 National Governors Association
 The Political Graveyard

|-

1932 births
Living people
Democratic Party governors of Vermont
Democratic Party members of the Vermont House of Representatives
Presidents of the University of Vermont
Vermont lawyers
Boston College Law School alumni
New York University School of Law alumni
Politicians from Cleveland
People from Stow, Massachusetts
People from Hudson, Massachusetts
People from Bellows Falls, Vermont